Acid Drinkers are a Polish thrash metal band formed in September 1986 in Poznań. Acid Drinkers were formed on 21 September 1986 consisting of Tomasz "Titus" Pukacki (vocals, bass) and Robert "Litza" Friedrich (guitar, vocals). The band's style is thrash metal, with influences of heavy metal and hardcore punk. Acid Drinkers are rated as one of the most important bands in the Polish thrash and heavy metal world.

History
The band's lineup expanded as Dariusz "Popcorn" Popowicz (lead guitar) and a drummer Piotr "Chomik" Kulk (shortly after replaced by Maciej "Ślepy" Głuchowski) joined the band. With this lineup, the band worked on its own compositions, such as "Barmy Army", "Del Rocca" and "I Mean Acid". Within a month of the band's creation, Pukacki was called to join the army and left the band for two years. The others did not intend to idle their time away; Friedrich and Popowicz undertook a reactivation of the band named Slavoy. Soon both of them received a proposal to play for reputable groups: Popowicz from Wolf Spider, and Friedrich from Turbo.

After returning from the army, Pukacki tried to reactivate his first band, Los Desperados. His attempts failed and Pukacki himself, after meeting with Popowicz, decided to reform Acid Drinkers with Friedrich and Maciek "Ślimak" Starosta. Their debut took place 26 August 1989 on Słodowa Island in Wrocław. That performance was actually the beginning of the band's true career. Rumors about a new heavy metal group swiftly spread across Poland. Soon afterwards, the band received an opportunity to record an album. With this line-up came their best-known classics, including their debut, Are You a Rebel?, Vile Vicious Vision, and their most famous, Infernal Connection. At the end of 1998, Friedrich decided to leave the band. Przemysław "Perła" Wejmann, a vocalist and guitarist and a leader of Guess Why, replaced him. With Wejmann on board, the Acids recorded three albums: Amazing Atomic Activity, Broken Head and Acidofilia. At the very beginning of 2003, Wejmann decided to leave the band. It took almost a month before a new guitarist was chosen. The new member, Tomek "Lipa" Lipnicki, turned out to be a well-known frontman of an already-disbanded group, Illusion. Together with Lipnicki, the Acids recorded a well-received long-play, Rock Is Not Enough. After over a year of cooperation, the new guitarist left Acid Drinkers for his own project, Lipali. His place in the band was taken over by Aleksander "Olass" Mendyk from None. The new member of Acid's crew quickly integrated himself into the band and was an active member. The band released a critically acclaimed album Verses of Steel, with most of the songs written by the new guitarist. On 30 November 2008, Mendyk died from circulatory failure in Kraków, at the age of 29. He was replaced on 9 May 2009 by Wojciech "Jankiel" Moryto.

Acid Drinkers are widely considered the best thrash metal band in Poland. Their popularity has gone far beyond the typical metal music sphere. The Acids have played over 500 shows, including in major festivals such as Jarocin, Metalmania, Węgorzewo, Przystanek Woodstock and Odjazdy; they performed at many of these festivals as headliners. They preceded performances in Poland by, among others, Deep Purple, Megadeth, Bruce Dickinson, Sepultura, Paradise Lost and Slayer. Moreover, many
known Polish artists such as Edyta Bartosiewicz, Kazik Staszewski, Tomek Lipnicki, Patrycja Kosiarkiewicz and Grzegorz Skawiński took part
in Acids' recordings. Acid Drinkers were four times (in 1998, 2000, 2004, 2009) awarded with a Fryderyk in the hard and heavy category, and in 1998 TVP 2 awarded them the "Złoty bączek" (Golden spinning top) award for being the best music group from Poland. Additionally, they were acknowledged as one of the five best Polish artists of the 1990s (together with Hey, Kazik Staszewski, Edyta Bartosiewicz and O.N.A.) by journalists and readers of Tylko Rock (Only Rock) magazine.

In 2010, the band released a second cover album called Fishdick Zwei - The Dick Is Rising Again. The band members covered compositions from artists such as Red Hot Chili Peppers, Metallica, Slayer, Frank Sinatra Donna Summer, The B52's, and guests (Anna Brachaczek team BiFF and Czesław Mozil).

Band members

Current
 Tomek "Titus" Pukacki – vocals, bass 
 Darek "Popcorn" Popowicz – lead guitar 
 Maciek "Ślimak" Starosta – drums 
 Łukasz "Dzwon" Cyndzer – rhythm guitar, vocals

Former
 Piotr "Chomik" Kuik – drums 
 Maciej "Ślepy" Głuchowski – drums 
 Robert "Litza" Friedrich – rhythm guitar, vocals 
 Przemek "Perła" Wejmann – rhythm guitar, vocals 
 Tomek "Lipa" Lipnicki – rhythm guitar, vocals 
 Alex "Olass" Mendyk – rhythm guitar, vocals 
 Wojciech "Jankiel" Moryto – rhythm guitar, vocals

Live
 Paweł "Paulo" Grzegorczyk – rhythm guitar 
 Robert "Bobby" Zembrzycki – rhythm guitar

Timeline

Discography

Studio albums

Cover albums

Compilation albums

Live albums

Video albums

Music videos

References

External links

 Official site (archived)
 Acid Drinkers on MySpace
 

Polish thrash metal musical groups
Musical groups established in 1986
1986 establishments in Poland
Mystic Production artists
Metal Mind Productions artists
Musical quartets